Steenhuisen is a surname. Notable people with the surname include:

John Steenhuisen (born 1976), South African politician
Paul Steenhuisen (born 1965), Canadian composer